Chumash Painted Cave State Historic Park is a unit in the state park system of California, preserving a small sandstone cave adorned with rock art attributed to the Chumash people. The  park was established in 1976.

The smooth and irregularly shaped shallow sandstone cave contains numerous drawings apparently depicting the Chumash cosmology and other subjects created in mineral pigments and other media over a long period ranging from about 200 up to possibly 1000 years or more. There is also evidence of graffiti beginning with early white settlers, which eventually led to creation of a protective physical barrier and State Historic Park status. In 1972 it was added as Site #72000256 on the National Register of Historic Places.

The cave is adjacent to the left side of this narrow one-lane mountain road, with a slightly widened shoulder that provides parking for one or two vehicles. The drive is not appropriate for trailers and RVs, due to some very tight turns and steep sections. This park is one of the few providing open access for viewing original rock art of the Chumash people in person. Flash photographs are prohibited since they can harm the artwork; some people use flashlights to help view the art, and some take photographs with long exposures with the camera braced on the metal gate or using a tripod.

See also
Burro Flats Painted Cave
Chumash people
Painted Rock
Shalawa Meadow, California
List of California state parks

References

External links

Official website

California State Historic Parks
Caves of California
Parks in Santa Barbara County, California
Rock art of the Chumash people
Santa Ynez Mountains
Archaeological sites on the National Register of Historic Places in California
National Register of Historic Places in Santa Barbara County, California
1976 establishments in California
Protected areas established in 1976
Landforms of Santa Barbara County, California
Archaeological sites in California
Native American history of California
Show caves in the United States